"Play" is a song by English DJ Jax Jones and English band Years & Years, released as a single on 28 November 2018. It was included on Jones' Snacks EP. Sung by Olly Alexander, it is Jones' first track to feature male lead vocals since 2016's "House Work". The song is also included on the track listing of Years & Years' second studio album Palo Santo, rereleased the same day as the single.

Music video
The music video for the song depicts Jax Jones and Olly Alexander at a superstore, wherein they dance around. There are also fairly brief scenes of Jax as a cashier in the same store at the beginning and end of the video.

Background
Jones stated that he wanted to work with Olly Alexander of Years & Years because of his "unique voice", later saying "it was great to collaborate with someone so down to earth and open to new ideas." On working together, Alexander said the pair "giggled the whole time and danced around. I wrote loads of ideas and then we picked the ones we liked and made the song out of it."

Critical reception
Gay Times writer Daniel Megarry called the chorus "infectious" and labelled its sound UK garage, soul and house.

Cover art
The Vodafone Big Top 40 called the cover art a parody of Play-Doh.

Promotion
Jones announced the collaboration on 26 November 2018, revealing the song would be released two days later.

Charts

Weekly charts

Year-end charts

Certifications

References

2018 singles
2018 songs
Deep house songs
Jax Jones songs
Years & Years songs
Songs written by Jax Jones
Songs written by MNEK
Songs written by Olly Alexander
Songs written by Mark Ralph (record producer)
Song recordings produced by Mark Ralph (record producer)
Song recordings produced by Jax Jones